Rajesh Jha is a Nepali politician and former Governor of Madhesh Province. He is a journalist and an advocate. He has completed Bachelor's level in law and also has done PhD from Tribhuvan University.

References

Governors of Madhesh Province
Year of birth missing (living people)
Living people
Tribhuvan University alumni